Democratic Center Party was a conservative political party in Turkey.

It was established by the former mayor of İstanbul Bedrettin Dalan on May 17, 1990, who left the center-right Motherland Party ANAP, he was one of the founders in 1983.

Democratic Center Party merged with the Süleyman Demirel's right-wing, conservative True Path Party DYP on September 14, 1991, shortly before the general elections of October 20, 1991.

Defunct conservative parties in Turkey
Liberal conservative parties in Turkey
Political parties established in 1990
1990 establishments in Turkey
1991 disestablishments in Turkey
Political parties disestablished in 1991